The Ausper is a racing car that was made in the United Kingdom from 1960 to 1962 by Competition Cars of Australia. It started life as a normal Formula Junior car, with a rear-mounted Cosworth engine set in a tubular space frame, with a Renault gearbox. Originally, it was based on the Tomahawk, a design from Australian Tom Hawkes that was intended for export to his home country. One of the unusual features of the Ausper was the bodywork, which was very low, with an upswept tail and the drivers roll bar faired into the headrest.

The Ausper was revised in 1962, with sleeker bodywork, and a total height of 24 inches to the top of the body. Results were encouraging, and Ausper developed plans for a Formula One car using a Clisby V-6 engine, but these plans never eventuated, which led to Ausper closing down.

References

External links
Ausper history

Cars introduced in 1960
1960s cars
Racing cars